National Mobile Television (NMT) was a Los Angeles-based television broadcasting industry corporation that operated a fleet of mobile television units.

Then known as Northwest Mobile Television, NMT was founded by Stan Carlson and Stimson Bullitt in 1968 and operated as a division of the King Broadcasting Company in Seattle, Washington.  In 1992 when King was sold to the Providence Journal, NMT was spun off as an independent entity. It was acquired by Oaktree Capital Management in 1997.

On March 23, 2009 NMT went into receivership and closed its doors.

See also
 Outside broadcasting

References

External links
Official website—

Television companies of the United States
Entertainment companies based in California
Companies based in Los Angeles
Defunct companies based in Greater Los Angeles
Mass media companies established in 1968
Companies disestablished in 2009
Oaktree Capital Management media holdings